The carunculated fruit dove (Ptilinopus granulifrons) is a species of bird in the family Columbidae. It is endemic to Obira.

Its natural habitats are subtropical or tropical moist lowland forests, subtropical or tropical moist shrubland, and arable land. It is threatened by habitat loss.

References

External links
BirdLife Species Factsheet.

carunculated fruit dove
Birds of the Maluku Islands
carunculated fruit dove
Taxonomy articles created by Polbot